Ancistrus maximus is a species of catfish in the family Loricariidae. It is native to South America, where it occurs in the Branco River basin in Roraima, Brazil. The species is notable among members of Ancistrus for its comparatively large size, reaching 20.1 cm (7.9 inches) SL, a characteristic which is also the source of its specific epithet.

References 

Fish of Brazil
maximus
Fish described in 2015